Links of Noltland is a large prehistoric settlement located on the north coast of the island of Westray in Orkney, Scotland. The extensive ruins includes several late Neolithic and early Bronze Age dwellings and is place of discovery of the Westray Wife figurine, first uncovered during an excavation in 2009. Historic Environment Scotland established the site as a scheduled monument in 1993.

Location
Links of Noltland is located south of the Bay of Grobust on the island of Westray in Orkney, Scotland. Close to the site is the Knowe of Queen o' Howe broch and further south is Noltland Castle.

Description
The ancient settlement, dating from around 3300 BCE to 800 BCE, contains several late Neolithc and Bronze Age structural ruins, now buried beneath sand dunes.  During excavations between 1978 and 1981, large midden deposits, structural remains, and field walls, which indicated evidence of prehistoric cultivation and field boundaries, were uncovered. Among the finds in the western area of the site was a hearth and several red deer skeletons. In the eastern section of the archaeological site, was a large building which had survived to roof height. The structure included several separate rooms and compartments joined by passages. 

In 2009, archaeological excavation uncovered a large building described as a "village hall". During this excavation, a lozenge-shaped figurine that is believed to be the earliest representation of a human face ever found in Scotland, now known as the Westray Wife (or Orkney Venus) was discovered. The face has two dots for eyes, heavy brows and an oblong nose and a pattern of hatches on the body could represent clothing. Archaeologist Richard Strachan described it at the time as a find of "astonishing rarity". Two further figurines were subsequently found at the site, one in 2010 and the other in 2012, a situation described as "unprecedented" by Culture Minister Fiona Hyslop.

Later excavations, along with geophysical and topographical surveys, have revealed additional structural remains, increasing the number of probable Neolithic buildings to six and the number of Bronze Age buildings to eight. Many Neolithic artefacts have been found, including polished stone axes, worked bone objects, and grooved ware pottery. 

Historic Environment Scotland established the site as a scheduled monument in 1993.

See also
Timeline of prehistoric Scotland
Ness of Brodgar
Knap of Howar

Footnotes

3rd-millennium BC architecture in Scotland
Archaeological sites in Orkney
Stone Age sites in Scotland
Bronze Age sites in Scotland
Prehistoric Orkney
Historic Scotland properties in Orkney
Scheduled monuments in Scotland
Neolithic Scotland
Westray